Antimotility agents are drugs used to alleviate the symptoms of diarrhea.  These include loperamide (Imodium), diphenoxylate with atropine (Lomotil), and opiates such as paregoric, tincture of opium, codeine, and morphine.  In diarrhea caused by invasive pathogens such as Salmonella, Shigella, and Campylobacter, the use of such agents has generally been strongly discouraged, though evidence is lacking that they are harmful when administered in combination with antibiotics in Clostridium difficile cases.  Use of antimotility agents in children and the elderly has also been discouraged in treatment of EHEC (Shiga-like toxin producing Escherichia coli) due to an increased rate of hemolytic uremic syndrome.

See also 

 Traveler's diarrhea
 Infectious diarrhea

References 

Antidiarrhoeals